Thomasia discolor is a species of flowering plant in the family Malvaceae and is endemic to the south-west of Western Australia. It is a small, compact shrub with hairy new growth, heart-shaped leaves with wavy, lobed edges, and pink flowers in crowded clusters.

Description
The edges of the leaves are wavy and lobed, the lower surface densely covered with white or rust-coloured, star-shaped hairs. Flowering occurs from September to December.

Taxonomy and naming
Thomasia discolor was first formally described in 1845 by Ernst Gottlieb von Steudel in Lehmann's Plantae Preissianae from specimens collected in 1840. The specific epithet (discolor) means "variegated", referring to the leaves.

Distribution and habitat
This thomasia grows in coastal heath in moist places, hill slopes and tops in the Esperance Plains and Jarrah Forest bioregions of south-western Western Australia.

Conservation status
Thomasia discolor is listed as "not threatened" by the Western Australian Government Department of Biodiversity, Conservation and Attractions.

References

Rosids of Western Australia
Plants described in 1845
discolor
Taxa named by Ernst Gottlieb von Steudel